Inushiki (犬式 aka Dogggystyle) is a Japanese band, formed in Tokyo, Japan in 1998. The band's members are vocalist Yohei Miyake, guitarist Seitaro Mine, bassist Shoji Ishiguro, and drummer Kazunari Kakinuma. Inushiki is noted for its blend of reggae, rock, and funk as well as its revolutionary politics and lyrics. The group's music is distinguished primarily by Yohei's lyrical poetry and band's synergy. Inushiki are founding members of National School Band Associates (NBSA), with collaborate often with NBSA affiliate artists such as Bagdad Cafe, Soil and Pimp Sessions, as well as local Kichijōji-based artist Latyr Sy.
After Yohei's political career was finished the band got together again in 2017 releasing a 5 tracks new album in 2022 (Animalize Yourself) and restarting the Japan Tours.

Discography
Inushiki EP (犬式) (2002)
Flying Fish EP (飛魚) (2002)
Reggae Midori EP (レゲミドリ) (2003)
Month Peach Disco EP (月桃ディスコ) (2004)
Life is Beatfull (2005)
Diego Express (2007)
Animalize Yourself (2022)

External links
 Keikaku Review of Life is Beautiful
  Wind Blow '07 - Sagara Beach - Shizuoka Japan
 NBSA +×÷　information
 Inushiki Official Site
 Inushiki MySpace Page
 Dogggystyle Victor Entertainment Profile (Japanese)

Japanese rock music groups
Japanese reggae musical groups
Musical groups established in 1998
Musical groups from Tokyo